Gerry Perry (born July 17, 1930) was a defensive lineman and placekicker in the National Football League. Perry played college football at University of California at Berkeley and was selected in the 29th round of the 1952 NFL Draft by the Los Angeles Rams.

References

1930 births
Living people
People from Ballston Spa, New York
Players of American football from New York (state)
American football defensive linemen
American football placekickers
California Golden Bears football players
Detroit Lions players
St. Louis Cardinals (football) players